The 2017–18 AFC Bournemouth season was the club's 3rd consecutive season in the top flight of English football and their 128th year in existence. This season Bournemouth participated in the Premier League as well as the FA Cup and EFL Cup.

The season covered the period from 1 July 2017 to 30 June 2018.

First-team squad

 (vice-captain)

Transfers
Transfers in

Transfers out

Loans out

Overall transfer activity

Expenditure
Summer:  £30,000,000

Winter:

Total:  £30,000,000

Income
Summer: 

Winter:

Total: 

Net Totals
Summer:  £30,000,000

Winter:

Total:  £30,000,000

Pre-season
Bournemouth announced six pre-season friendlies, against Queens Park Rangers, Yeovil Town, Portsmouth, Valencia, Estoril and Napoli.

Competitions

Premier League

League table

Result summary

Results by matchday

Matches
On 14 June 2017, AFC Bournemouth's 2017–18 Premier League fixtures was announced.

FA Cup
In the FA Cup, Bournemouth entered the competition in the third round and were drawn at home to either AFC Fylde or Wigan Athletic. The latter won their replayed match 3–2 to set up the third round tie.

EFL Cup
Bournemouth entered the competition in the second round and were drawn against Birmingham City away. A home tie versus Brighton & Hove Albion was confirmed for the third round. The Cherries were drawn at home to Middlesbrough for the fourth round. A quarter-final trip to face Chelsea was drawn out for Bournemouth.

Statistics
Appearances and goalsLast updated on 29 April 2018.|-
! colspan=14 style=background:#dcdcdc; text-align:center|Goalkeepers|-
! colspan=14 style=background:#dcdcdc; text-align:center|Defenders|-
! colspan=14 style=background:#dcdcdc; text-align:center|Midfielders|-
! colspan=14 style=background:#dcdcdc; text-align:center|Forwards|-
! colspan=14 style=background:#dcdcdc; text-align:center| Player(s) who have made an appearance or had a squad number this season but have left the club

|-
|}

CardsAccounts for all competitions. Last updated on 1 January 2018.Clean sheetsLast updated on 1 January 2018.''

References

A.F.C. Bournemouth
AFC Bournemouth seasons